Paul Kipketer Korir (born July 15, 1977, in Kipkoror, near Lessos, Nandi District in the Rift Valley Province) is a middle distance athlete from Kenya.

Biography
He graduated from Kilibwoni High School in Nandi District in 1996. He has started running seriously a year earlier. In 2000 he finished 2nd at an athletics meeting in Kakamega and was spotted by Moses Tanui and was signed by Fila club managed by Federico Rosa. In 2001 he switched to KIM club. He made an international breakthrough in 2003, winning gold medal at the All-Africa Games and 2003 World Athletics Final.

In the run up to the 2004 Summer Olympics in Athens, Greece he was ranked world number three behind Hicham El Guerrouj and Bernard Lagat which would have given him a good medal chance had he not been dropped from the Kenyan Olympics team after finishing only fourth in his country's Olympic trials.

Korir used to attend the PACE Sports Management training camp in Kaptagat. He is managed by Ricky Simms and coached by Jimmy Beauttah. He is married and has a daughter born in 2002.

He is not to be confused with Paul Atudonyang Korir a Kenyan marathon runner.

Achievements
1500 m Major achievements
2003
2003 All-Africa Games - Abuja, Nigeria.
gold medal
2003 World Athletics Final
winner
2004
2004 IAAF World Indoor Championships - Budapest, Hungary.
gold medal
2004 African Championships - Brazzaville, Republic of the Congo.
gold medal

References

External links

IAAF: Focus on Athletes

1977 births
Living people
Kenyan male middle-distance runners
People from Nandi County
African Games gold medalists for Kenya
African Games medalists in athletics (track and field)
Athletes (track and field) at the 2003 All-Africa Games
World Athletics Indoor Championships winners